Steve "Speedy" Gonzalez (born May 1, 1981) is a former American football wide receiver who played one season with the Philadelphia Soul of the Arena Football League. He first enrolled at Modesto Junior College before transferring to Menlo College. Gonzalez was also a member of the San Diego Riptide, Manchester Wolves, Green Bay Blizzard and Dallas Vigilantes. He appeared on Michael Irvin's reality show 4th and Long.

Early years
Gonzalez played football, baseball and basketball at Ceres High School in Ceres, California.

College career
Gonzalez first played college football for the Modesto Junior College Pirates, starting at cornerback and wide receiver for two years.

He then transferred and played for the Menlo Oaks of Menlo College for one year before dropping out of college after his junior year. Unable to pay the tuition, he instead took jobs such as working for a moving company and a coffee shop.

Professional career

San Diego Riptide
Gonzalez played for the San Diego Riptide of the af2 in 2005. He played in 13 games for the Riptide during the 2005 season, leading the af2 in kick return yards with 1,666 and kick return touchdowns with six. He was also fourth in the league in all-purpose yards with 2,792 and tenth in scoring with 206 points. Gonzalez earned Second Team honors on the National Conference All-af2 team.

Manchester Wolves
Gonzalez was signed by the Manchester Wolves of the af2 in November 2005 and played for the team during the 2006 season. He played offense in fifteen games for the Wolves, recording 1,355 receiving yards and 45 touchdowns on 118 receptions. He saw action on defense in two games, accumulating seven pass breakups and one interception. Gonzalez was also fourth in the af2 with 2,525 all-purpose yards and second in scoring with 276 points. He suffered an ankle injury that caused him to miss the last two games of the regular season and all of the playoffs. He was named the sixth best kick returner in af2 history in 2009.

Philadelphia Soul
Gonzalez signed with the Philadelphia Soul in October 2006 and played for the team during the 2007 season. He was released by the Soul on August 1, 2007.

Green Bay Blizzard
Gonzalez played for the Green Bay Blizzard of the af2 in 2008.

4th and Long
Gonzalez was the fifth cut on Michael Irvin's reality show 4th and Long.

Dallas Vigilantes
Gonzalez was signed by the Dallas Vigilantes on January 13, 2010.

References

External links
Just Sports Stats

Living people
1981 births

American football wide receivers
Modesto Pirates football players
Menlo Oaks football players
San Diego Riptide players
Manchester Wolves players
Philadelphia Soul players
Green Bay Blizzard players